Empire Couriers Park the formally known Warrior Park is the home ground of association football club Olympia FC Warriors who play in the NPL Tasmania. Warrior Park is situated in the Greater Hobart suburb of Warrane.

Sports venues in Hobart